List of Registered Historic Places in Clinton County may refer to:

List of Registered Historic Places in Clinton County, New York
List of Registered Historic Places in Clinton County, Michigan